Wigbolt, Baron Ripperda (1535? – 16 July 1573) was the city governor of Haarlem when the city was under siege by the Spanish army in the Eighty Years' War.

Biography
Wigbolt Ripperda was the son of Baron Focko Ripperda van Winsum and Baroness Clara van Ewsum, and born in Winsum. The Ripperda family was one of the oldest and most powerful noble families in the Ommelanden, nowadays known as the province of Groningen in The Netherlands. Focko and Clara Ripperda had four sons: Peter, Asinge, Onno, Wigbolt and Johanna, a daughter.

Wigbolt studied in Geneva and Orléans, together with his brother Onno. There he studied Latin and other languages. In Geneva, where Calvin was preaching, he got into contact with Protestantism, the new religion that inspired the Dutch Revolt. He became a strong believer in Protestantism.

When he returned to Winsum he was involved in the wave of iconoclasm in the Netherlands (the Beeldenstorm). On 14 September 1566 Wigbolt and his brothers, as well as two other men, broke into the church in Winsum and destroyed the statues of saints and the altar.

Wigbolt joined the army of the Prince of Orange, the geuzen, and became hopman . Until August 1572 he was commander of the guard of William van der Marck, Lord of Lumey, who brought him to the city of Haarlem. He became governor of Haarlem after that.

On 4 December, a week before the siege started, Ripperda 'cleaned' the Sint-Bavokerk of all catholic symbols.

Siege of Haarlem
When it became clear that a large Spanish army under command of Don Fadrique was approaching the city he inspired the citizens and municipality of Haarlem not to give in to the demands of the Spanish king, but to fight and defend the city.

The city stayed loyal to the Prince of Orange and resisted the Spanish army in a 7-months siege. After this long and bitter siege the city had to surrender because of a lack of food and supplies. On 12 July 1573 the city officially surrendered to Don Fadrique.

Death
Ripperda was captured together with other soldiers and imprisoned in a church in Haarlem. On 16 July at 11.00 o'clock he was transferred to the Grote Markt, where he was beheaded. His brother Asinge, who was also in the city, was smuggled out of the city by a Spaniard.

Although the city was defeated, the siege of Haarlem had been so exhausting for the Spanish army that in the Siege of Alkmaar they were defeated.

His brother Onno died on 17 June 1580.

A number of streets and buildings in Haarlem and Winsum are named after Ripperda.

References
Het beleg van Haarlem; Haarlem's heldenstrijd in beeld en woord 1572-1572, F. De Witt Huberts, Oceanus, 1944
Magazine of the Historische vereniging Winshem, number 1 (May 1997) 

Specific

1530s births
1573 deaths
Dutch nobility
Dutch people of the Eighty Years' War (United Provinces)
Dutch military commanders
Dutch expatriates in Spain
People from Winsum
People from Haarlem
Executed Dutch people
People executed by Spain by decapitation